Great Western Mountain is the 8th highest mountain in Sri Lanka. It is located in Nuwara Eliya District. Its trail is ranked as difficult due to its steep incline and difficult, unclear path.

References

Mountains of Sri Lanka
Landforms of Nuwara Eliya District